Vahagn (or Vahakn) is a common Armenian male given name, referring to ancient Armenian god of war and courage Vahagn – the Armenian counterpart of the Zoroastrian god of victory Verethragna, whose name in Avestan means "smiting of resistance". See Վահագն for more on the origin of the name.

People with the name

Vahagn
Vahagn Davtyan (1922–1996), Armenian poet, translator, publicist and activist
Vahagn Hayrapetyan (born 1968), Armenian jazz musician
Vahagn Khachatryan (born 1959), Armenian politician
Vahagn Militosyan (born 1993), Armenian footballer
Vahagn Minasyan (born 1985), Armenian footballer
Vahagn (King of Armenia)

Vahakn
Vahakn Dadrian (born 1926), Armenian-American sociologist and historian
Vahakn Medzadourian (born 1978), Armenian-American entrepreneur and investor

Armenian masculine given names